Liu Xiaomei (born 2 May 1985) is a Chinese handball player for Anhui and the Chinese national team.

In 2004, she finished eighth with the Chinese team in the women's competition. She played all seven matches and scored 14 goals.

References

External links
Profile

1985 births
Living people
People from Chuzhou
Sportspeople from Anhui
Chinese female handball players
Handball players at the 2004 Summer Olympics
Handball players at the 2008 Summer Olympics
Olympic handball players of China
Handball players at the 2002 Asian Games
Handball players at the 2006 Asian Games
Handball players at the 2010 Asian Games
Handball players at the 2018 Asian Games
Asian Games gold medalists for China
Asian Games silver medalists for China
Asian Games bronze medalists for China
Asian Games medalists in handball
Medalists at the 2002 Asian Games
Medalists at the 2010 Asian Games
Medalists at the 2018 Asian Games